The 6th Asian Junior Table Tennis Championships 1997 were held in Panaji, India, from  1 to 6 September 1997. It was organised by the Table Tennis Federation of India under the authority of the Asian Table Tennis Union (ATTU) and International Table Tennis Federation (ITTF).

Medal summary

Events

Medal table

See also

Asian Table Tennis Championships
Asian Table Tennis Union

References

Asian Junior and Cadet Table Tennis Championships
Asian Junior and Cadet Table Tennis Championships
Asian Junior and Cadet Table Tennis Championships
Asian Junior and Cadet Table Tennis Championships
Table tennis competitions in India
International sports competitions hosted by India
Asian Junior and Cadet Table Tennis Championships